Frederick Mackenzie may refer to:

Politicians
Frederick Mackenzie (Quebec politician) (1841–1889), Member of the Canadian Parliament for Montreal West
Frederick Donald MacKenzie (1882–1970), Member of the Canadian Parliament for Neepawa

Others
Frederick Arthur MacKenzie, journalist and author
Frederick Mackenzie (cricketer) (1849-1934), English cricketer
Frederick Mackenzie (painter) (1788–1854), British watercolour painter and architectural draughtsman
Fred Mackenzie, Scottish golfer
Fred T. Mackenzie (born 1934), American sedimentary and global biogeochemist